Garešnica is a town in Bjelovar-Bilogora County, Croatia. It is located in the geographical region of Moslavina. There are a total of 10,472 inhabitants, of whom 85% are Croats.

It was first mentioned in 1527. The church Visitation of Our Lady was built in 1752 and has still a lot of original inventory.

The town is home to a memorial to its deceased defenders from the Croatian War of Independence.

Settlements 
The following settlements comprise the Town of Garešnica:

 Ciglenica, population 368
 Dišnik, population 343
 Duhovi, population 111
 Garešnica, population 3,874
 Garešnički Brestovac, population 908
 Gornji Uljanik, population 116
 Hrastovac, population 479
 Kajgana, population 271
 Kaniška Iva, population 466
 Kapelica, population 546
 Mala Bršljanica, population 48
 Mali Pašijan, population 190
 Malo Vukovje, population 122
 Rogoža, population 248
 Tomašica, population 365
 Trnovitički Popovac, population 392
 Uljanički Brijeg, population 26
 Uljanik, population 287
 Velika Bršljanica, population 228
 Veliki Pašijan, population 344
 Veliki Prokop, population 48
 Veliko Vukovje, population 251
 Zdenčac, population 441

History
In the late 19th and early 20th century, Garešnica was a district capital in the Bjelovar-Križevci County of the Kingdom of Croatia-Slavonia.

Notable people 
 Slavko Kolar (1891–1963), writer
 Ivo Robić (1923–2000), singer and songwriter
  (born 1958), philosopher

Notes

External links 
 

Cities and towns in Croatia
Populated places in Bjelovar-Bilogora County
Bjelovar-Križevci County